The 2019–20 Hong Kong Second Division League was the 6th season of the Hong Kong Second Division since it became the third-tier football league in Hong Kong in 2014–15. The season began on 15 September 2019 and ended on 16 April 2020 when the Hong Kong Football Association announced the cancellation of all lower division seasons due to the 2020 coronavirus pandemic in Hong Kong.

Teams

Changes from last season

From Second Division

Promoted to First Division
 North District 
 Sham Shui Po

Relegated to Third Division
 Qiyi Hanstti 
 Sun Hei

To Second Division

Relegated from First Division
 Double Flower 
 Mutual

Promoted from Third Division
 Chelsea Soccer School (Hong Kong) 
 Kwai Tsing

Name changing
 Mutual renamed as Sparta Asia
 Wing Go Fu Moon renamed as Fu Moon

League table

References

Hong Kong Second Division League seasons
2019–20 in Hong Kong football